Below is the list of populated places in Çankırı Province, Turkey by the districts.

Çankırı

Atkaracalar

Bayramören

Çerkeş

Eldivan

Ilgaz

Kızılırmak

Korgun

Kurşunlu

Orta

Şabanözü

Yapraklı

References

List
Cankiri